General elections were held in Thailand on 2 July 1995. The result was a victory for the Thai Nation Party, which won 92 of the 391 seats. Voter turnout was 62.0%. The prevalence of vote buying in this election was considered one of the highest to date.

Results

Further reading

References

Thailand
1995 elections in Thailand
Elections in Thailand